Gabriel Hoyos (born 3 March 1989) is a Colombian-American professional footballer who plays as a midfielder.

Career
Hoyos has played for the reserves of Bundesliga club SC Freiburg.

He made his international debut for United States U20 in 2009.

On 30 May 2014, Hoyos made his official debut for Miami Dade FC in a win over Nacional SC.

References

External links
 
 

Living people
1989 births
Association football midfielders
Colombian footballers
SC Freiburg players
Miami FC (2006) players
Miami Dade FC players
Colombian expatriate footballers
Colombian expatriate sportspeople in Germany
Expatriate footballers in Germany
Expatriate soccer players in the United States
People from Armenia, Colombia